Karen McGrane is a content strategist and website accessibility advocate, who wrote a book called Content Strategy for Mobile.

McGrane teaches Design Management at School of Visual Arts in New York. Her design philosophy is "every company is a technology company" and "every business is in the user experience business." McGrane was an early proponent of designing web content for mobile devices and is a frequent speaker at technology conferences. She was also the co-executive producer, with Jared Spool, of the UX Advantage Conference and cohost of the UX Advantage podcast. She co-hosted the Responsive Web Design podcast from 2014-2018 with Ethan Marcotte.

McGrane has done user experience design work for many major media companies including Condé Nast, Disney, and Citibank; with her company Bond Art + Science, she was the design lead on the New York Times' 2006 redesign. Prior to that she was Vice President and National Lead for User Experience at Razorfish where she was their first information architect hire in 1998. In August 2020 she co-founded the consultancy Autogram with Ethan Marcotte and Jeff Eaton.

Content Strategy for Mobile
Content Strategy for Mobile was published in 2012 by A Book Apart. It has been called an essential guide for people publishing serial content online, one that has a clear "plan of action." McGrane advocates for "adaptive content," small chunks of content that can appear on different platforms and in different contexts. For this to happen, content needs to have good metadata and exist within a content management system which is itself easy to use. Companies also need to do research into both their audience needs and the approaches of their competition in order to do this effectively. If done correctly, web content will "work everywhere, all the time."

She published her second book, Going Responsive, with A Book Apart in 2015.

Early life and education
McGrane has a BA in American Studies and Philosophy from the University of Minnesota and a Master's degree from Rensselaer Polytechnic Institute in Human Computer interaction.

References

External links
 Personal website

Living people
Web developers
American technology writers
Usability
Web design
Human–computer interaction researchers
Year of birth missing (living people)